William Robert Stuart-White (born 1959) is a British Anglican priest. He was Archdeacon of Cornwall from 2012 until 15 May 2018, when he was installed rector of All Saints', Falmouth.

Stuart-White was educated at Merton College, Oxford. He was ordained deacon in 1986 and priest in 1987. After a curacy in Armley he was priest in charge at Austrey. He then served at Camborne, Linkinhorne, St Breock and Egloshayle before his appointment as archdeacon.

References

1959 births
Living people
Alumni of Merton College, Oxford
Archdeacons of Cornwall